Adelaide United Football Club, an association football club based in Adelaide, South Australia, was founded in 2003. They became the first southern member admitted into the A-League in 2005, having spent their first and last season participating in the National Soccer League. The club's first team have competed in numerous nationally and internationally organised competitions, and all players who have played between 1 and 24 such matches, either as a member of the starting eleven or as a substitute, are listed below.

Key
 The list is ordered first by date of debut, and then if necessary in alphabetical order.
 Appearances as a substitute are included.
 Statistics are correct up to and including the match played on 11 March 2023. Where a player left the club permanently after this date, his statistics are updated to his date of leaving.

Players
Players highlighted in bold are still actively playing for Adelaide United.

References
General
 
 
 

Adelaide United FC players
Adelaide United
Players
Association football player non-biographical articles